Cifas is a fraud prevention service in the United Kingdom. It is a not-for-profit membership association representing organisations from across the public, private and voluntary sectors. Cifas states its mission is ‘to detect, deter and prevent fraud in society by harnessing technology and working in partnership’.

Cifas operates two core fraud prevention databases that are claimed to be the largest in the UK: the National Fraud Database and the Internal Fraud Database. Its systems are also used by banks and building societies to access Home Office immigration data through a specialist portal.

Data from Cifas' members reveals that instances of identity fraud in the UK are at record levels in the UK, particularly among people aged under 30.

Cifas data also highlights the growing issue of "money mules" – people who allow their bank accounts to be used to launder money.

History 
Cifas was established in 1988 by the Consumer Credit Trade Association (CCTA) under the acronym CIFAS: Credit Industry Fraud Avoidance System, although the company no longer operates under this acronym as the scope of its services has broadened. It was developed in association with the Office of Fair Trading, as well as the Information Commissioner's Office,  who continue to this day to take an active interest in the development of Cifas.

Cifas is today run by a board of directors, which includes both independent directors who are not directly involved in the day-to-day running of the organisation, and the Chief Executive and Chief Operating Officer, who are. From 1988 to 2016  the majority of the directors were elected by participating organisations. They now participate in the governance of the organisation through an "Advisory Board".

Fraud Databases 
Cifas' National Fraud Database allows participating organisations to exchange details of applications for products or services which are considered to be fraudulent, inconsistent or suspicious (see https://www.cifas.org.uk/fpn ); exchange information about accounts and services which are being misused; and information about insurance and other claims that are considered to be fraudulent, inconsistent or suspicious.

Organisations can also exchange information about innocent victims of fraud to protect them from further fraud.

The Internal Fraud Database allows participating organisations to exchange details of cases where an applicant or member of staff is considered to have acted fraudulently.

Under the Data Protection Act, an individual has the right to make a Subject Access Request to Cifas, who will, in accordance with the Act and its exemptions, disclose data held on the individual where the law permits it. Cifas is not a Credit Reference Agency but is the Data Controller for Cifas data and responsible for its accuracy.

Complaints 
All warnings used to be examined by specialist fraud staff in participating organisations, but now, automated systems may be used to refuse a product or service without any investigation of a warning. Cifas says: "The ability to make automated decisions allows members to immediately decline facilities to subjects who are deemed an immediate fraud risk. This is another massive step forward in utilising the data from Cifas, freeing up resources from reviewing referrals that have already been deemed a high fraud risk." (https://www.cifas.org.uk/insight/fraud-risk-focus-blog/how-updated-principles-using-cifas-national-fraud-database-help-its-members)

Consumers who are disadvantaged by this change in practice, may complain to the Information Commissioner and seek financial compensation from both Cifas and the responsible organisations who supplied and used the information. Consumers may also complain to one of the Ombudsman Services who cover the organisations represented within Cifas. This includes the Financial Ombudsman Service, the Communications Ombudsman, the Public Services Ombudsman and the Local Government & Social Care Ombudsman. To contact the Cifas Chief Executive by email go to this webpage. (https://ceoemail.com/s.php?id=ceo-977325&c=Cifas-Chief%20Executive)

Immigration Act 2014 
In 2014, the Immigration Act became law. Cifas was named as the sole provider of Home Office Immigration Data and launched the Cifas Immigration Portal (CIP) in December 2014. All current account-providing banks and building societies in the UK are required to use the CIP to access the Home Office data on disqualified persons. The data was implicated in the "Windrush Scandal". Complaints about this should be sent to The Home Office:
Complaints Allocation Hub, UK Visas and Immigration, 20 Wellesley Road, 7th Floor, Lunar House, Croydon, CR9 2BY. (https://www.gov.uk/government/publications/current-account-closed-or-refused-based-on-immigration-status)

Other Services 
Victims of identity fraud or people who are at risk of identity fraud can apply for Cifas Protective Registration for a £25 fee. Protective Registration acts as a warning the organisation should (but they are not forced to) carry out additional checks to verify the identity of the applicant or customer. They may just refuse the product or service instead as they consider the fraud risk to be too high.

Cifas used to operate a Protecting the Vulnerable scheme that helped local authorities protect individuals subject to the Mental Capacity Act 2005 in their care. This was merged into another service in 2020.

Financial Stability 
Cifas declared losses of £749,000 in 2017, a further loss of £578,000 in 2018, a loss of £1,328,000 in 2019 and further losses of £1,389,000 in 2020 and £627,000 in 2021. Losses now amount to £4.7 million in total but the Directors consider the organisation to be a well funded going concern. Costs grew from £5.6 million to £10.8 million between 2016 and 2021. 2022's accounts are not yet available. Cifas is funded largely from levies on financial services suppliers and other participating organisations funded by customers, and public sector organisations that are funded by taxpayers.

The financial benefits of Cifas, reported by its participating organisations, have reduced from a high of £268 per £1 of subscription income to £234 in 2018, £208 in 2019 and a further drop to £169 in 2020. The figure for 2021 was not published but it can be calculated from the published accounts as being £139. The published amount of fraud prevented by Cifas is up by approximately 30% in the last ten years, from £1 billion to £1.3 billion while costs and staff numbers have doubled. The Reserves are stated in the 2021 accounts to be £4.6 million but the net cash position shows Intangible Fixed Assets being capitalised to the value of £1.3 million. Only depreciation is charged to the annual Profit and Loss account. The remainder is funded from the cash reserves. Debtors have risen from £76,000 in 2015 to £1.4 million in 2021, signifying a significant deterioration in control of credit, with the working capital tied up, also funded from cash reserves. Available cash is just £1.9 million, and this covers the listed areas of Projects, Premises, Compliance, Consumer and IT Development, plus an amount to cover ongoing contractual obligations for the workforce whose salaries and benefits came to £7.1 million in 2021. The available cash reserves cover 3.2 months of salary costs.

Remuneration 
The 2021 accounts show that Cifas paid its current Chief Executive £264,363. The lowest paid staff are in outsourcers used by Cifas for telephone and clerical work who receive the national minimum wage. The Chief Executive receives 16 times more than these lowest paid workers. This is up from a multiple of 15 in the previous year.

Careers at Cifas 
Cifas employs staff in a variety of different functions that include information technology, data analysis, compliance, best practice, consumer relations, project management, sales and marketing, product development, training, administration, external relations and public relations, human resources and finance. There were numerous redundancies in 2017, 2018 and 2019, as well as recruitment to new positions.

Collaborations and Partnerships 
Cifas works with fraud prevention, financial, public sector, academic and charitable organisations and law enforcement to raise awareness of fraud and promote best practices in fraud prevention. Collaborative partners include the City of London Police, CIPFA, the Home Office, Age UK, Fraud Advisory Panel and UK Finance.

See also 
 Credit card fraud
 Identity fraud

References

External links 

 
Fraud Advisory Panel charity, corporate member organisations

Databases in the United Kingdom
Fraud in the United Kingdom
Organisations based in the London Borough of Camden
Fraud organizations